Frida Andersén (born 9 June 1990) is a Swedish Olympic eventing rider. She competed at the 2016 Summer Olympics in Rio de Janeiro, but had to withdraw during the individual competition after the cross-country phase.

Andersen also participated at the 2013 European Eventing Championships, where she won a team silver medal and placed 9th individually.

References

External links

Living people
1990 births
Swedish female equestrians
Equestrians at the 2016 Summer Olympics
Olympic equestrians of Sweden